Jamal Marshall (born July 3, 1993) is a former American football cornerback. He played college football at  North Texas. He was signed by the Seattle Seahawks in 2016.

High school career
Marshall was late to football only playing varsity his senior year finishing with 46 tackles, 20 PBUs and seven sacks as a senior while also running track at Elkins. Marshall had a highly decorated high school track career. He was a member of the 1600m relay team that made it to state in 2011, the following year Marshall made it to state in the 400 metres dash where he placed 5th with a 47.60 . Aldrich Bailey placing first with a time of 45.8. Marshall's personal best in high jump was 6'4 and running a 21.50 in the 200 metres dash.

Mixed martial arts career

Amateur career
In October 2018, Marshall announced he would start an MMA career and had been training for several months, although he had no previous experience in mixed martial arts.
Marshall made his amateur MMA debut on November 2, 2018, in which he was defeated by Isaac Moreno via submission in the final round.

Professional career
No professional fights

College career
Marshall received an athletic scholarship to attend University of North Texas, where he played for the North Texas Mean Green football team from 2012 to 2015. He began his career at North Texas as a Cornerback and played as a true freshman mainly on special teams. He switched to Outside linebacker after his freshman year due to high potential seen by the coaching staff. He shadowed outside linebacker Will Wright until his junior where he finally had his break out year at linebacker. Marshall saw action in all 12 games, notching 54 total tackles, including 36 solo, and 7.5 TFL. The prior year he had 27 tackles saw action in all 12 games and notched a season high of five tackles against Tulane. During the Heart of Dallas Bowl game he forced a key turnover sparking his path at linebacker. Heading into his final year Marshall decided to go back to his original position, cornerback. His switch back to corner lead him to have a down year only racking up 19 tackles and 3 Pbus.

Track and field

Marshall competed in track & field at North Texas as a relay sprinter. Helping the mean green 4x400m relay reach the regional meet with a time of 3.09.01. Also competing in the 200m dash and putting up a time of 20.98

Professional career

Marshall was signed to the Seattle Seahawks after impressing coaches after the three day rookie Mini-camp in 2016 as a tryout player. He was waived on June 1, 2017. He signed again with the Seattle Seahawks in the 2017 preseason.

References

External links

 Mean green Bio

 NFL player Bio

 Seattle Seahawk Bio

1993 births
American football cornerbacks
Living people
North Texas Mean Green football players
Players of American football from Texas
Seattle Seahawks players
Montreal Alouettes players